Degognia Creek is a stream in and flows along the boundary between Jackson and Randolph counties in the U.S. state of Illinois. It is a tributary to the Mississippi River.

Degognia Creek was named for a ranger of mixed white and Native American descent.

See also
List of rivers of Illinois

References

Rivers of Jackson County, Illinois
Rivers of Randolph County, Illinois
Rivers of Illinois